Holobrachia is a monotypic genus of brachiopods belonging to the order Terebratulida, family unknown. The only species is Holobrachia vietnamica.

The species is found in near Vietnam.

References

Terebratulida
Brachiopod genera
Monotypic brachiopod genera